This is the discography of British new wave/synth-pop band Blancmange.

Albums

Studio albums

Remix albums

Compilation albums

Box sets

Video albums

EPs

Singles

Radio session tracks
 "I Would" / "Living on the Ceiling" / "Waves" / "Running Thin" (Recorded for a February 1982 Peel Session show.)

Notes

References

Discographies of British artists
Pop music group discographies
Rock music group discographies
New wave discographies